After the 1960 census, Maryland was apportioned an eighth representative, an increase of one over its 1950 to 1960 apportionment.  From 1963 to 1967, the state kept the seven districts it had used since 1953 and used an at-large representative. After 1967, however, eight districts were drawn and the at-large district was eliminated.

Democrat Carlton R. Sickles was the sole at-large representative.

List of members representing the district

Further reading

 Congressional Biographical Directory of the United States 1774–present

External links 
 The Montgomery County Committee for Fair Representation was a branch of the State Committee for Fair Representation. Active from 1960-1968, it helped in the change of apportionment in the Maryland General Assembly. Its records are located at the University of Maryland Libraries.

Former congressional districts of the United States
At-large United States congressional districts
Constituencies established in 1963
1963 establishments in Maryland
Constituencies disestablished in 1967
1967 disestablishments in Maryland